João Paulo Pinto Ribeiro (born 8 April 1980), known as João Paulo, is a Portuguese former footballer who played as a centre forward.

Over nine seasons, he amassed Primeira Liga totals of 140 games and 23 goals for Boavista, Varzim, Beira-Mar, Estoril (two spells), Paços de Ferreira, União de Leiria and Leixões. He also competed professionally in Spain, Romania and Cyprus, mainly at the service of Rapid București.

Club career
Having grown through the ranks of Boavista FC, Porto-born João Paulo appeared very little for its first team, being loaned five times for the duration of his link in both the Primeira Liga and the second division of Portuguese football. His debut in the top flight came with Varzim SC, in 2001.

After being released in June 2005, João Paulo had an unassuming stint with Spanish second level club CD Tenerife, then returned to Portugal in January of the following year with F.C. Paços de Ferreira. He blossomed as a striker in the 2007–08 season at fellow league side U.D. Leiria (eight league goals and two UEFA Cup strikes, both against Bayer 04 Leverkusen, on home and away legs).

João Paulo moved to Romanian club FC Rapid București in January 2008, while Leiria would eventually rank last at the season's end in Portugal. Late in the same month but two years later, after failing to score more than three times in spite of being regularly played, he returned to his country and joined top-tier strugglers Leixões S.C. until the end of the campaign.

In June 2010, following Leixões' relegation, João Paulo returned abroad, signing with Olympiakos Nicosia of Cyprus. The following season, the 31-year-old switched to another team in the country, Apollon Limassol.

Honours
Portugal
UEFA European Under-18 Championship: 1999

References

External links

1980 births
Living people
Footballers from Porto
Portuguese footballers
Association football forwards
Primeira Liga players
Liga Portugal 2 players
Segunda Divisão players
Boavista F.C. players
C.D. Aves players
C.D. Feirense players
Vitória F.C. players
Varzim S.C. players
S.C. Beira-Mar players
G.D. Estoril Praia players
F.C. Paços de Ferreira players
U.D. Leiria players
Leixões S.C. players
F.C. Famalicão players
F.C. Tirsense players
Segunda División players
CD Tenerife players
Liga I players
FC Rapid București players
Cypriot First Division players
Olympiakos Nicosia players
Apollon Limassol FC players
Portugal youth international footballers
Portugal under-21 international footballers
Portugal B international footballers
Portuguese expatriate footballers
Expatriate footballers in Spain
Expatriate footballers in Romania
Expatriate footballers in Cyprus
Portuguese expatriate sportspeople in Spain
Portuguese expatriate sportspeople in Romania
Portuguese expatriate sportspeople in Cyprus